The 2019 Berlin Marathon was a marathon race held on 29 September 2019 in Berlin, Germany. It was the 46th edition of the annual Berlin Marathon. The elite men's race was won by Kenenisa Bekele in 2:01:41, two seconds slower than the world record set by Eliud Kipchoge in 2018. The elite women's race was won by Ashete Bekere following a sprint finish in 2:20:14. The wheelchair men's and women's races were won by Marcel Hug and Manuela Schär in 1:28:09 and 1:38:07, respectively.

Course

The course starts at the Großer Stern in the Tiergarten and runs west on the Straße des 17. Juni before turning right at the Ernst-Reuter-Platz onto the Franklinstraße. The course turns east and passes the  before crossing the Spree via the Moltke Bridge, running along the southern side of the Spreebogenpark and crossing the river again via the Crown Prince Bridge. The runners continue east through Mitte until  before turning south to cross the :de:Michaelbrücke into Neukölln. At just before , the course turn east onto the Gneisenaustraße where the course passes the halfway mark. The runners leave Schöneberg in a south-westerly direction, passing the Rathaus Schöneberg to enter Steglitz. The course runs west until just after , where it turns north-east onto Hohernzollerndamm. The runners head in the direction of the finish, passing the Kaiser Wilhelm Memorial Church in the 35th kilometre before heading east along the Leipziger Straße to the Konzerthaus Berlin. The course turns back west and passes through the Brandenburg Gate in the 42nd kilometre before re-entering the Tiergarten to finish.

The course also has few corners and is run on asphalt instead of concrete which is easier for the runners' legs. The Berlin Marathon has been host to eight men's and three women's world records since the first race in 1974.

The 2019 edition took place on the 29 September. The title sponsor for the race was German automotive corporation BMW, with the main sponsors being sportswear company Adidas, healthcare and pharmaceutical Abbott Laboratories, and tire company Giti Tire.

Field
According to World Athletics, the favourite in the women's elite race was Gladys Cherono. She had won the previous year's event in a time of 2:18:11, as well as the 2015 and 2017 editions. Vivian Cheruiyot had to withdraw from the race due to issues with her Achilles tendon. Cherono was due to face tough competition from Meseret Defar who had won the 5000 metres event at the 2004 and 2012 Summer Olympics and had a marathon personal best of 2:23:33. Also racing were Mare Dibaba (2:19:52 personal best), Melat Kejeta, who was running her marathon debut and was aiming for the time of 2:22:00 having run a 1:08:41 in the half marathon, and three women who had run sub-2:22:00; Haftamnesh Tesfaye (2:20:13), Helen Tola (2:21:01), and Ashete Bekere (2:21:14). The race director, Mark Milde, called it "one of the strongest women's fields in the history of the event".

According to World Athletics, the favourite for the men's race was Kenenisa Bekele, who had won the 2016 edition in a personal best of 2:03:03. However, Bekele had struggled with an injury and had not raced since May 2019, and since setting his personal best, had withdrawn from more races than he had finished. Three other runners, all Ethiopians, had personal bests under 2:05; Leul Gebresilase, winner of the 2018 Valencia Marathon and a personal best of 2:04:02, Sisay Lemma (2:04:08), and Birhanu Legese, winner of the 2019 Tokyo Marathon and a personal best of 2:04:15. 
The pacemakers aimed to run through halfway in 1:01:30.

The men's wheelchair race featured 61-year-old Heinz Frei who had won the race 20 times. Brent Lakatos, winner of the 2018 race, returned to defend his title from Marcel Hug, who had lost to Lakatos in the sprint, and David Weir, the eight-time winner of the London Marathon. Also racing were 2014 winner Kota Hokinoue and Ernst van Dyk, who had won a gold medal at the 2016 Summer Paralympics. In the women's wheelchair race, four-time winner Manuela Schär returned to defend her 2018 title, which she won in a world record time of 1:36:53. She faced 2018 third place finisher Sandra Graf, and others including Madison de Rozario and Amanda McGrory.

Race summary
By , they were still 8 seconds ahead of the world record split and a group of five (Bekele, Legese, Gebresilase, Lemma, and Jonathan Korir) went through halfway in 1:01:05, one second ahead of the world record split. By , Gebresilase dropped out of the group and was soon joined by Korir, as Legese made a move shortly before the  mark, dropping Bekele then Lemma. Bekele closed the gap, easily passing by Legese in the 38th kilometre and continued on to pass through  two seconds faster than Kipchoge's split. However, during his world record run, Kipchoge had increased the pace in the final two kilometres and Bekele was not able to match that. Despite sprinting down the final straight, he fell two seconds short of the world record in 2:01:41. Legese finished second in 2:02:48, the third-fastest marathon time ever, and Lemma was third in 2:03:36.

The women's race started with a pace that would have the lead pack finishing in the 2:20-2:22 range, with Cherono visible at the front. However, just before , Cherono dropped out of the race due to an infection. The race came down to a sprint finish where Bekere was able to win in 2:20:14 over Dibaba, who finished in 2:20:21. Sally Chepyego Kaptich was third in 2:21:06, with Tola in fourth. Sara Hall ran a four minute personal best to finish fifth and Melat Yisak Kejeta placed sixth in 2:23:57. In the women's wheelchair race, Schär built up an early lead and was two and a half minutes ahead of the other competitors, a lead which she extended to four minutes by the end to win in 1:38:07. McGrory and Rozario finished second and third in 1:42:05 and 1:42:09, respectively. Weir finished second in 1:31:45, with Lakatos third, one second behind.

Results 
Results for the top ten in the running races and top three in the wheelchair races are listed below.

References

External links 

 Official website

2019 in Berlin
Berlin Marathon
Berlin Marathon
Berlin Marathon
Berlin Marathon